Sylvia Harris (born 1953 in Richmond, Virginia, died July 24, 2011) was an African-American graphic designer and design strategist. She has been considered a pioneer in the field of social impact design.

In honor of her memory the American Institute of Graphic Arts created the Sylvia Harris Citizen Design Award, which honors a professional designer who has created a project that enhances public life.

Personal life and education 
Harris was born in Richmond, Virginia during 1953. As she grew she experienced racism and attended a desegregated high school. Harris has stated that she remembers her mother shouting from her car at the Ku Klux Klan while they were displaying on the street. Her father coached women's sports, and her mother was an art teacher and artist. After graduating high school Harris went on to attend Virginia Commonwealth University, where she graduated with a BFA in communication art and design in 1975. Harris attended graduate school at the Yale School of Art, where she graduated with an MFA in 1980. She eventually married her husband Gary Singer, with whom she had one daughter, Thai.

Harris died on July 24, 2011. She had collapsed three days prior while attending a meeting in Washington, D.C. and was taken to George Washington University Hospital, where she later died due to heart problems.

Early career

Harris moved to Boston after college and discovered graphic design as a career path. Harris began working at Washington Business Group on Health, where Chris Pullman mentored her. Her second position was at Architects Collaborative working on environmental graphics. On Pullman's advice she left Architects Collaborative to earn an MFA in graphic design from Yale.

After graduating she co-founded Two Twelve Associates, Inc. with David Gibson and Juanita Dugdale in 1980. During this time she did design work for Citibank.

In 1994, she left Two Twelve to form Sylvia Harris LLC. She focused on using design to solve problems for civic agencies, universities, and hospitals.

She renamed Sylvia Harris LLC to Citizen Research and Design as the company's focus shifted towards a design process driven by public research. In 2011 she co-founded the non-profit Public Policy Lab "committed to the more effective delivery of public services to the American people." In 2014 she was awarded the American Institute of Graphic Arts medal.

Works

2000 United States Census 
Harris was the creative director behind the design of the 2000 Census for the United States Census Bureau. The goal of the 1998 user-centered form redesign was to encourage Americans, including those who were previously underrepresented citizens, to participate.

New York-Presbyterian/Columbia Medical Center 
Sylvia Harris was hired as an independent project leader to develop a design for communication with patients more effectively for New York-Presbyterian and Columbia University Medical Center. This project emerged because of a 2001 New York-Presbyterian/Columbia survey that showed majority of first-time patients get lost trying to get to their appointment. The reason patients got lost was because of poor signs, lack of funding for feature for the building, etc. For Harris to plan the project she had to go through five steps. The first step was assessment which was getting to the cause of the problem, the second step was management which was making sure the building is under control. The third step was coming up with a strategy to fix the problems, the next step was the designs, and the last step was implementation which was making negotiations for the designs to be approved.

References 

1953 births
2011 deaths
People from Richmond, Virginia
American graphic designers
Virginia Commonwealth University alumni
African-American graphic designers
20th-century African-American people
21st-century African-American people
AIGA medalists